Berkelland is a municipality in the Netherlands province of Gelderland. It was created on 1 January 2005 from the merger of the former municipalities of Borculo, Eibergen, Neede, and Ruurlo. The new municipality was named after the Berkel, a small river.

Population centres
Formerly part of Borculo: Borculo, Geesteren, Gelselaar, Haarlo.
Formerly part of Eibergen: Avest, Beltrum, Eibergen, Holterhoek, Hupsel, Lintvelde, Loo, Mallem, Olden Eibergen, Rekken, Zwolle.
Formerly part of Neede: Achterveld, Broeke, Hoonte, Lochuizen, Neede, Noordijk, Noordijkerveld, Rietmolen.
Formerly part of Ruurlo: Brinkmanshoek, De Bruil, De Haar, Heurne, Mariënvelde, Ruurlo, Veldhoek.

Topography

Dutch Topographic map of the municipality of Berkelland, June 2015.

Government
The Eibergen community houses the interception station of the Nationale SIGINT Organisatie.

Notable people 

 Jobst of Limburg (1560 in Borculo - 1621) Count of Limburg and Bronckhorst
 Menno ter Braak (1902 in Eibergen – 1940) a Dutch modernist author
 Annie Borckink (born 1951 in Hupsel) a former speed skater, gold medallist at the 1980 Winter Olympics
 Bert Teunissen (born 1959 in Ruurlo) a Dutch photographer, documents European homes built before WWII
 Astrid Bussink (born 1975 in Eibergen) a Dutch filmmaker 
 Joris Laarman (born 1979 in Borculo) a Dutch designer, artist and entrepreneur, uses emerging technologies
 Judith Pietersen (born 1989 in Eibergen) a Dutch volleyball player, competed in the 2016 Summer Olympics

Gallery

Climate

References

External links

Official website

 
Achterhoek
Municipalities of Gelderland
Municipalities of the Netherlands established in 2005